Hsieh Cheng-peng and Christopher Rungkat were the defending champions and successfully defended their title, defeating Toshihide Matsui and Vishnu Vardhan 7–6(9–7), 6–1 in the final.

Seeds

Draw

References

External links
 Main draw

Busan Open - Doubles
2019 Doubles